The Maquoketa Community School District is a rural public school district based in Maquoketa, Iowa.  The district is mainly in Jackson County, with small areas in Clinton, and Dubuque counties.  The district serves the cities of Maquoketa, Baldwin, Zwingle, and surrounding rural areas.

Chris Hoover was hired as the superintendent in 2014, after serving as shared superintendent in South Winneshiek Community School District and Turkey Valley Community School District.

The school's mascot is the Cardinals. Their colors are red and white.

Schools
The district operates four schools, all in Maquoketa:
Briggs Elementary School
Cardinal Elementary School
Maquoketa Middle School
Maquoketa Community High School

See also
List of school districts in Iowa
List of high schools in Iowa

References

External links
 Maquoketa Community School District

School districts in Iowa
Education in Jackson County, Iowa
Education in Clinton County, Iowa
Education in Dubuque County, Iowa